Yusi Avianto Pareanom (born November 9, 1968 in Semarang, Central Java) is an Indonesian author. He is known in the Indonesian literary landscape for his novels and short stories, which have been published in various newspapers. In 2016 Yusi Avianto was a recipient of a Khatulistiwa Literary Award in the prose category for his novel Raden Mandasia Si Pencuri Daging Sapi (2016).

References

1968 births
Living people
People from Semarang
Writers from Central Java
Indonesian male writers